is a passenger railway station in the city of Isesaki, Gunma, Japan, operated by the private railway operator Tōbu Railway.

Lines

Station layout
The station is unstaffed and consists of a single island platform, connected to the station building by a footbridge.

Platforms

History
Gōshi Station opened on 27 March 1910.

From 17 March 2012, station numbering was introduced on all Tōbu lines, with Gōshi Station becoming "TI-23".

Passenger statistics
In fiscal 2019, the station was used by an average of 1575 passengers daily (boarding passengers only).

Surrounding area
Isesaki High School

References

External links

 Tobu station information  

Railway stations in Gunma Prefecture
Tobu Isesaki Line
Stations of Tobu Railway
Railway stations in Japan opened in 1910
Isesaki, Gunma